An election for mayor of the City of Lancaster in Pennsylvania was held on November 3, 2009.  Incumbent Mayor Rick Gray, a Democrat, defeated challenger Charles W. "Charlie" Smithgall, a Republican by 313 votes, out of 7,261 cast.

Gray announced his intention to seek a second term as mayor on December 17, 2008. Former two-term mayor Charles W. "Charlie" Smithgall, who had initially declined to run, won the Republican primary by write-in vote by supporters. Smithgall, who was in office from 1998 until 2006, was not a declared candidate in the primary. Smithgall announced on June 26, 2009, that he would accept the nomination.

Election background
Smithgall was first elected to office in 1997, easily defeating his Democratic opponent, attorney Jon Lyons, with 52 to 36 percent of the vote.  Smithgall won re-election for a second term in the 2001 mayoral election against Democrat Ed Ruoff.

Smithgall sought to seek a third term in the 2005 mayoral election.  His Democratic challenger during that election was Rick Gray, a lawyer. The 2005 campaign between Smithgall and Gray was the most expensive mayoral election in Lancaster's history.  Smithgall and Gray raised a combined $229,000 for their campaigns: Smithgall raised $146,792 and Gray $82,072.  In a surprise outcome, Smithgall, an early favorite for re-election, was defeated by Gray by 16 percentage points.

2009 campaign
Gray announced his intention to seek a second term as mayor  on December 17, 2008.  He was unopposed in the Democratic primary and initially had no Republican opposition in the general election as well.

Smithgall initially declined a potential rematch with Gray, leaving no Republican challenger. However, a grassroots campaign was launched by supporters of the former mayor to support him as a write-in candidate in the Republican primary. Despite the efforts by supporters to draft him into the election, Smithgall remained out of the mayoral race until after the May 2009 primary. Smithgall received 227 write-in votes from supporters in the primary. Smithgall's supporters needed 100 votes to draft him as their write-in candidate and validate a potential candidacy.

After some consideration, Smithgall entered the race and officially announced his candidacy on June 26, 2009.

Unlike the 2005 election, Gray has outraised and outspent Smithgall by nearly five times between June 2009 and October 2009.  Gray had raised in $33,908 and had approximately $20,805 in cash on hand as of October 19, 2009. By contrast, Smithgall raised just $6,900 and had just $519 in cash on hand during the same time period.

References

External links 
Rick Gray for Mayor 2009 campaign
Charlie Smithgall for Mayor 2009 campaign

Lancaster Mayor
Lancaster
History of Lancaster, Pennsylvania
2009